Ancistrus lithurgicus is a species of catfish in the family Loricariidae. It is a freshwater species native to South America, where it occurs in the basin of the Essequibo River in Guyana. The species reaches 13.2 cm (5.2 inches) SL.

References 

lithurgicus
Catfish of South America
Fish described in 1912